The Carrier Mortar Tracked (CMT) vehicle is a self-propelled mortar system developed by the Combat Vehicles Research and Development Establishment of Defence Research and Development Organisation (DRDO) in India. It is manufactured by Ordnance Factory Medak.

Description
The Carrier Mortar Tracked vehicle is based on "Sarath" ("Chariot of Victory") Indian licence-produced variant of BMP-2. This turret-less version has an 81 mm mortar mounted in the modified troop compartment. The mortar is fired through an opening in the hull roof that has two hinged doors. It has a maximum range of 5,000 m, a normal rate of fire of 6-8 rds/min and capacity to fire from 40° to 85° and traverse 24° on either side. There is also a long-range version of the mortar. The vehicle carries 108 mortar rounds and is also fitted with a 7.62 mm machine gun with 2,350 rounds.  It can be operated by all mechanised infantry battalions moves along with the leading mechanised elements providing instantaneous fire support up to a depth of five km behind enemy lines. It can also provide protection to crew and mortar fires.  Besides providing services like aerial targets, the vehicle also has amphibious capabilities.

Deployment
The first prototype was complete in 1997 and it is currently in production at the Ordnance Factory Board, India.
India manufactured around 220 CMT.

Specification
 Crew infantry: 	        2 + 4 
 Weight (tonnes): 	        13

Performance
 Engine power (HP):		300 
 Power to weight ratio (HP/T):	23
 Maximum speed (km/h): 
 On road: 		        65 
 Cross country: 		48 
 Speed in water (km/h): 	7 
 Trench crossing (metres): 	2.3 
 Maximum gradient (degrees):   35

Weapon system
 81 mm mortar
 Traverse: 		        24 degrees to either side of mean position 
 Elevation:		        40 degrees to 85 degrees
 Ammunition: 		        108 rounds 
 84 mm RCL Gun (shoulder fired)
 Ammunition: 		        12 rounds 
 7.62 mm M/C Gun in A/D role (for aerial targets)
 Ammunition: 		        2350 rounds

Other
 Drinking water:               320 litres 
 Mortar base plate stowed for ground firing

References

External  links
 

Military vehicles of India
Tracked mortars
Military vehicles introduced in the 2000s